{{Infobox Boxingmatch
|fight date             = June 17, 2017
|Fight Name             = The Rematch
|image                  = 
|location               = Mandalay Bay Events Center, Las Vegas, Nevada, U.S.
|titles                 = WBA (Undisputed), IBF, WBO, and vacant The Ring light heavyweight titles
|fighter1               = Andre Ward
|nickname1              = S.O.G.
|record1                = 31–0 (15 KO)
|hometown1              = Oakland, California, U.S.
|height1                = 6 ft
|weight1                = 175 lb
|style1                 = Orthodox
|recognition1           = WBA (Undisputed), IBF, and WBO light heavyweight champion[[The Ring (magazine)|The Ring]] No. 1 ranked pound-for-pound fighter2-division world champion
|fighter2               = Sergey Kovalev
|nickname2              = Krusher
|record2                = 30–1–1 (26 KO)
|hometown2              = Kopeysk, Chelyabinsk Oblast, Russia
|height2                = 6 ft
|weight2                = 175 lb
|style2                 = Orthodox
|recognition2           = The Ring No. 2 ranked pound-for-pound fighterFormer unified light heavyweight champion
|result                 = Ward wins via 8th-round TKO
}}
Andre Ward vs. Sergey Kovalev II, billed as The Rematch'', was a boxing superfight for the unified WBA (Undisputed), WBO, IBF,  and vacant The Ring magazine light heavyweight titles between the top-two best pound-for-pound fighters in the world. Andre Ward won by an 8th round TKO. The bout was held on June 17, 2017 in Las Vegas, Nevada and was televised on HBO Pay-per-view.

Background 
Kovalev's manager Egis Klimas announced that negotiations had begun for the rematch between Ward and Kovalev. According to the NSAC, The T-Mobile Arena was put on hold for June 17, 2017 on HBO PPV. On March 24, 2017 Kovalev revealed via Social Media that he had signed his end of the deal. It was also noted that the rematch would take place at the Mandalay Bay in Paradise, Nevada on HBO PPV.

On April 4, 2017, Roc Nation Sports and Main Events confirmed that terms were agreed for the rematch to take place on HBO PPV. The fight being billed as "No Excuses". Ward addressed the public by stating, "I'm going to keep it short and sweet. You got what you asked for -- now you have to see me on June 17. This time leave the excuses at home." The Las Vegas Sun confirmed the bout will take place at the Mandalay Bay Events Center. The fight purses were revealed before the fight with Ward taking a guaranteed career-high $6.5 million and Kovalev, not having a base purse, would receive a percentage of PPV and gate revenue.

The fight 
In front of 10,592, The fight ended in the 8th round with a victory for Ward once again. A big right hand from Ward had Kovalev in trouble which was followed by several blows to the body. With Kovalev appearing hurt against ropes, the referee Tony Weeks stopped the fight. At the time of stoppage, two judges had Ward ahead 67-66, whilst the third judge had it 68-65 in favour of Kovalev. CompuBox stats showed that Ward landed 80 of 238 punches (34%) whilst Kovalev landed 95 of his 407 thrown (23%).

Post-fight 
Ward praised Kovalev in the post-fight interview, "He's a good fighter, and I have nothing but respect for him. First time around, the man is world champion, and he's been on top a long time. I give him credit. He is a great fighter, and when you fight great fighters, you have to raise your game." Kovalev said the fight could have continued, "I don't know. I can't explain it. Not every round, but I thought I was doing very good. I was better, and he was better this fight. I didn't feel like I was getting knocked down with his punches --- I could have continued," Kovalev said. "I didn't feel the punch. This is fighting. We are boxers. Yes, he did punch me, but he didn't hurt me. The fight should have continued."

Viewership 
According to Yahoo Sports, the fight only generated around 130,000 buys on HBO PPV. The replay was shown on regular HBO averaging 752,000 viewers and peaked at 947,000, which was during the final round.

The event produced a live gate of $2,187,340 from 6,366 tickets sold, including complimentary tickets, the full attendance was announced as 10,592. The venue was set up to hold 10,748.

Fight card

Press conferences
The fight had press conferences in three cities in the United States:

April 10, 2017 — New York City, New York
April 11, 2017 — Oakland, California
April 12, 2017 — Los Angeles, California

See also
 Sergey Kovalev vs. Andre Ward

References

External links
 Sergey Kovalev's career boxing record
 Andre Ward's career boxing record
 Sergey Kovalev vs. Andre Ward I at HBO

Boxing matches
2017 in boxing
Boxing in Las Vegas
Boxing on HBO
2017 in sports in Nevada
2017 in American sports
June 2017 sports events in the United States